Carl Ertel (born 15 October 1959) is a retired German rower who won one gold and one silver medal in the coxless pairs at the world championships of 1982–1983, rowing with Ulf Sauerbrey. He finished fifth in this event at the 1988 Summer Olympics, together with Uwe Gasch. His former wife, Carmela Schmidt, is a retired Olympic swimmer.

References

1959 births
Living people
Sportspeople from Gera
People from Bezirk Gera
German male rowers
Olympic rowers of East Germany
Rowers at the 1988 Summer Olympics
World Rowing Championships medalists for East Germany
20th-century German people